Grzegorz Kurec (5 May 1868 in Shipka, Belarus - 6 March 1942 in Berlin, Germany)  was a Polish entrepreneur, architect and builder of Belarusian origins. He created one of the biggest paper factories of the time - Grigiškės. He was also founder of Grigiškės city. His son Włodzimierz was a pilot and rally driver.

Background 
Kurec was born in 1868 in a family of Belarusian farmers in Shipka village. As a child, he was interested in mechanics and worked as an apprentice and as a metalworker in some factories of Vilnius. He gained experience at the Putilov Company and then with private orders.

Career 
In the autumn of 1925, he opens Grigiškės. It could produce 5 tons of paper per year. The factory was nationalized in 1940 when the Soviets came. All of Kurec's property was evaluated as being worth 8 million litas.

External links
 History of the Kurec's factory
 History of factory on the official site
 W. Wolkanowicz's article about Grzegorz Kurec son. (pol.)

1868 births
1942 deaths